#Twice4 (Hashtag Twice4) is the fourth Japanese compilation album released by South Korean girl group Twice. The album consists of Japanese and Korean versions of "I Can't Stop Me", "Cry for Me", "Alcohol-Free", and "Scientist". It was released on March 16, 2022, under Warner Music Japan.

Background and release 
On January 31, 2022, JYP Entertainment announced in an official statement that Twice's fourth best album was set to be released on March 16. The Japanese version of "Scientist" was released as a promotional single for the album, on March 2, 2022.

The compilation album was officially released on March 16, 2022. The digital and streaming version of #Twice4 was released in EP format, only containing Japanese-language tracks.

Commercial performance 
Following its release, #Twice4 debuted atop the Oricon Albums Chart, becoming the group's eighth number-one album on the chart. Twice became the first foreign female artist to achieve the feat. The album also peaked at number-one on the Billboard Japan Hot Albums.

Track listing

Charts

Weekly charts

Monthly charts

Year-end charts

Certifications

References 

Twice (group) albums
Warner Music Japan compilation albums
2022 compilation albums
Japanese-language compilation albums